Vardenik (Serbian Cyrillic: Варденик) is a mountain in southern Serbia, near the town of Surdulica. Its highest peak Veliki Strešer has an elevation of 1,875 meters above sea level. Vardenik surrounds the Vlasina plateau and Vlasina Lake along with Čemernik and Gramada.

References

Mountains of Serbia
Rhodope mountain range